Alexandre Plante (born May 9, 1989) is a Canadian-South Korean professional ice hockey defenceman who is currently playing for Anyang Halla of the Asia League Ice Hockey (AL). He was selected by the Edmonton Oilers 15th overall in the 2007 NHL Entry Draft and made his National Hockey League (NHL) debut in 2009–10. He is the son of former professional defenceman Cam Plante, while his brother, Tyler, is a goaltending coach for the Brandon Wheat Kings.

Playing career 

Plante played junior hockey for the Calgary Hitmen of the Western Hockey League (WHL). The Hitmen selected him with their second round pick, 21st overall, in the 2004 WHL Bantam Draft. He established himself as a regular on Calgary's blue line in 2005–06, playing in 54 games. He appeared in 58 more in 2006–07 and attracted greater attention from NHL scouts in the 2007 playoffs, scoring 11 points in 13 games. As a result, the Edmonton Oilers selected him 15th overall in the 2007 NHL Entry Draft, a higher position than he was initially expected to go. 

Several injuries limited Plante to 36 games in 2007–08 and he failed to report to Calgary's training camp prior to the 2008–09 WHL season, claiming that the team had treated him poorly the previous year. While he initially demanded a trade out of Calgary, Plante ultimately recanted and returned to the Hitmen early in the season. He rebounded from his "nightmare season" in 2007–08 to rank among the leaders of the Hitmen defence with 45 points in the regular season and another 15 in the playoffs before Calgary was upset in the league championship series by the Kelowna Rockets.

The Oilers signed Plante to a three-year contract following the season. He began his professional career in 2009–10 with Edmonton's top minor league affiliate, the Springfield Falcons of the American Hockey League (AHL). Several injuries on Edmonton's defence led the Oilers to recall Plante, and he made his NHL debut on February 1, 2010 against the Carolina Hurricanes and recorded an assist. He was returned to Springfield as injured players returned to the Oilers' lineup.

On July 18, 2013, Plante was signed as a free agent to his first European contract on a one-year deal with Dornbirner EC of the Austrian Hockey League. He joined Anyang Halla of the Asia League Ice Hockey in 2015, and gained South Korean citizenship in 2017.

Career statistics

Regular season and playoffs

International

References

External links 

1989 births
HL Anyang players
Calgary Hitmen players
Canadian ice hockey defencemen
Dornbirn Bulldogs players
Edmonton Oilers draft picks
Edmonton Oilers players
Ice hockey people from Manitoba
Living people
Lørenskog IK players
National Hockey League first-round draft picks
Oklahoma City Barons players
South Korean ice hockey defencemen
Canadian emigrants to South Korea
Sportspeople from Brandon, Manitoba
Springfield Falcons players
Naturalized citizens of South Korea
Ice hockey players at the 2018 Winter Olympics
Olympic ice hockey players of South Korea
Canadian expatriate ice hockey players in Austria
Canadian expatriate ice hockey players in Norway
Canadian expatriate ice hockey players in South Korea
Canadian expatriate ice hockey players in the United States